Guluoshan Township is an rural township in Sangzhi County, Zhangjiajie, Hunan Province, China.

Administrative division
The township is divided into 13 villages, the following areas: Liujiahe Village, Zhuojiaping Village, Luotan Village, Houjiabao Village, Sunjiatai Village, Xuetangbao Village, Zhoujiabao Village, Babatian Village, Gufengshan Village, Guluoshan Village, Hejiatian Village, Niudongkou Village, and Qingwan Village (刘家河村、卓家坪村、罗谭村、候家包村、孙家台村、学堂包村、周家包村、粑粑田村、谷峰山村、谷罗山村、何家田村、牛洞口村、清弯村).

References

External links

Former towns and townships of Sangzhi County